Butamya Glacier is the 6.9 km long and 2.5 km wide glacier on Barison Peninsula, Graham Coast on the west side of Antarctic Peninsula, situated northwest of Talev Glacier and north-northeast of Chernomen Glacier.  It drains northwards, and flows into Beascochea Bay.

The glacier is named after the seaside locality of Butamya in Southeastern Bulgaria.

Location
British mapping in 1971 and 1976.

See also
 List of glaciers in the Antarctic
 Glaciology

Maps
 British Antarctic Territory.  Scale 1:200000 topographic map. DOS 610 Series, Sheet W 65 64.  Directorate of Overseas Surveys, Tolworth, UK, 1971.
 British Antarctic Territory.  Scale 1:200000 topographic map. DOS 610 Series, Sheet W 65 62.  Directorate of Overseas Surveys, Tolworth, UK, 1976.
 Antarctic Digital Database (ADD). Scale 1:250000 topographic map of Antarctica. Scientific Committee on Antarctic Research (SCAR), 1993–2016.

References
 Bulgarian Antarctic Gazetteer. Antarctic Place-names Commission. (details in Bulgarian, basic data in English)
 Butamya Glacier. SCAR Composite Gazetteer of Antarctica

External links
 Butamya Glacier. Copernix satellite image

Bulgaria and the Antarctic
Glaciers of Graham Coast